Felix Cantalicio Aracuyú was an early 20th century Paraguayan anarchist.

Bibliography

Further reading 

 

Paraguayan anarchists
Anarcho-syndicalists
Paraguayan people of American descent
Paraguayan people of Guarani descent